The 2021 CONCACAF Gold Cup was an international football tournament that took place in July and August 2021, involving sixteen men's national teams from nations affiliated to the Confederation of North, Central America and Caribbean Association Football (CONCACAF). The tournament was broadcast via television and radio all over the world.

Television

CONCACAF

International

Radio

CONCACAF

References

Broadcasting Rights